The  is an  long railway line in Fukuoka Prefecture, Japan, connecting Hakata Station in Fukuoka with Hakata-Minami Station in Kasuga. It is operated by the West Japan Railway Company (JR West).

Service
Although the line uses Shinkansen equipment, trains are officially designated as limited express trains. In practice, however, most services are extensions of San'yō Shinkansen Kodama services. The Kyushu Shinkansen, opened on 12 March 2011, shares part of the route.

The trip from Hakata to Hakata-Minami takes ten minutes and costs ¥300.

Rolling stock
 500-7000 series 8-car sets
 700-7000 series 8-car Rail Star sets
 N700-7000/8000 series 8-car sets

History
The line was originally opened in March 1975 to transport San'yō Shinkansen trains from the Hakata terminal to Hakata Depot in Kasuga. At that time, Kasuga was a rural region and did not merit a railway station of its own. By the late 1980s, however, the area had become a sprawling suburb of Fukuoka. JR decided to build a station adjacent to the depot, and inaugurated service on 1 April 1990 with 0 Series Shinkansen trains.

See also
 Gala-Yuzawa Line, another Shinkansen-style non-Shinkansen line

References

Shinkansen
High-speed railway lines in Japan
Lines of West Japan Railway Company
Rail transport in Fukuoka Prefecture
Standard gauge railways in Japan
Railway lines opened in 1975